Agonopterix astrantiae is a moth of the family Depressariidae. It is found in most of Europe, except the Iberian Peninsula, most of the Balkan Peninsula and the Benelux.

The wingspan is 19–22 mm. Adults have been recorded in May.

The larvae feed on  Sanicula europaea and Astrantia major. They create a leaf spinning from which they feed.

References

External links
lepiforum.de

Moths described in 1870
Agonopterix
Moths of Europe